Milenko Bošnjaković (born 4 March 1968) is a Bosnian professional football manager. He is the current manager of Bosnian Premier League club Tuzla City.

Managerial statistics

Honours

Manager
Tuzla City
Second League of FBiH: 2014–15 (North), 2015–16 (North)

References

External links

1968 births
Living people
Sportspeople from Tuzla
Bosnia and Herzegovina football managers
FK Tuzla City managers
FK Radnički Lukavac managers
FK Sloboda Tuzla managers
FK Drina Zvornik managers
FK Zvijezda 09 managers
Premier League of Bosnia and Herzegovina managers